The Caraboctonidae (hairy scorpions) are part of the superfamily Iuroidea. The family was established by Karl Kraepelin in 1905.

List of genera and species
 Hadrurus
 H. arizonensis
 H. spadix

References

 
Scorpion families